Eray Ervin Cömert (born 4 February 1998) is a Swiss professional footballer who plays as a defender for La Liga club Valencia and the Switzerland national team.

Club career

Basel
Cömert started his youth football with Concordia Basel. In 2009, he transferred to Basel and played in their youth system. He played his debut in their first team on 10 February 2016 in the Letzigrund during the 3–2 away win against Zürich. Under trainer Urs Fischer Cömert won the Swiss Super League championship at the end of the 2015–16 Super League season.

In the 2016–17 UEFA Youth League group stage Cömert played in each of the six matches as the Basel U-19 team qualified for the knock-out round. In the away match on 28 September 2016 against Arsenal in the 40th minute hescored the first goal from over 45 meters as Basel won 2–1.

Loans to Lugano and Sion
On 8 March 2017 Basel announced that they were loaning out Cömert to Lugano, until the end of the 2016–17 Swiss Super League season, so that he could gain first team playing experience. He played 12 Matches for Lugano and helped the team to avoid relegation. On 7 July the club announced that they were loaning Cömert out to Sion, for the 2017–18 Swiss Super League season.

Breakthrough
After the loan period, at the beginning of July 2018, Cömert returned to his club of origion. Under trainer Marcel Koller FCB won the Swiss Cup in the 2018–19 season. Cömert played only in two of these cup games.

In the following two and a half seasons Cömert was a regular starter in the team. The club announced, on 25 February 2022, that he had transferred out and moved to Spanish club Valencia. Cömert had come through Basel's youth system from the U-12 to U21 and since he advanced to the first team in 2016, he had played a total of 140 games for Basel and scored seven goals. 101 of these games were in the Swiss Super League, 9 in the Swiss Cup, and 30 in European competitions (Champions, Europa and Conference League). He scored five goals in the domestic league and two in European competitions.

Valencia
On 25 January 2022, Cömert moved abroad for the first time in his career, after signing a four-and-a-half-year contract with La Liga side Valencia CF, for a rumoured fee of €800,000.

International career
Cömert was born in Switzerland and is of Turkish descent. Cömert played various international games for the Swiss U-15, U-16 and U-17 teams. He played his debut for the Swiss U-18 national team as centre-back on 22 September 2015 as they won 2–1 against the Danish U-19. On 30 August 2016 he played his first game for the Swiss U-19 and led the team as captain to a 1–0 victory against the Slovakian U-19.

He made his debut for Switzerland national football team on 18 November 2019 in a Euro 2020 qualifier against Gibraltar. He substituted Manuel Akanji in the 65th minute. In 2021 he was called up to the national team for the 2020 UEFA European Championship, where the team reached the quarter-finals.

Honours
FC Basel
 Swiss Super League: 2015–16, 2016–17
 Swiss Cup: 2018–19

References

External links
 Profile at the Valencia CF website
 season 2015/16 on the Swiss Football League homepage
 
 fcb-archiv.ch

1998 births
Living people
Footballers from Basel
Association football defenders
Swiss men's footballers
Swiss people of Turkish descent
Switzerland youth international footballers
Switzerland under-21 international footballers
Switzerland international footballers
UEFA Euro 2020 players
2022 FIFA World Cup players
Swiss Super League players
La Liga players
FC Basel players
FC Lugano players
FC Sion players
Valencia CF players
Swiss expatriate footballers
Swiss expatriate sportspeople in Spain
Expatriate footballers in Spain